Charles John Mayle Whichelo (1784–1865), who usually signed as John Whichelo, was a British marine, landscape and topographical painter.

His works were engraved for Londina Illustrata, The Beauties of England and Wales and David Hughson's Walks Through London.

References

External links 

1784 births
1865 deaths
British painters